Coleophora neolycii is a moth of the family Coleophoridae which is endemic to China (Ningxia).

The larvae feed on Lycium barbarum. They feed in the leaves or stems of their host plant. They primarily mine the leaves from the underside. The first generation begins feeding in the middle of May and causes severe damage from the middle of June to early July. Different instars overwinter in cases attached to branches or axillary buds. Pupation takes place from the middle of April to early May within the larval case that is attached to a stem with silk after the final instar turns around to face the anal opening of the case. Adults emerge in May.

Etymology
The specific name is derived from the Greek prefix neo- (meaning new) and the specific name lycii, in reference to its relationship with Coleophora lycii.

References

External links

neolycii
Moths described in 2006
Endemic fauna of China
Moths of Asia